Grove City High School is a high school in Grove City, Ohio, United States.  It is one of the five high schools in the South-Western City Schools district.  It houses about 1,900 students in grades 9-12. Formerly Jackson High School, Grove City High School moved from the former Park Street building in 1970, where it had been located since 1929.  Grove City High School was chartered in the fall of 1895.  The average classroom experience of GCHS teachers is 15.89 years.  46 teachers have bachelor's degrees and 63 have master's degrees or beyond. Special training has included TESA, Continuous Quality Improvement (CQI) training, site-based leadership training, integrated learning, alternative assessment, and alternative classroom management. Grove City High School has been A School Of Excellence for five years now.

Instrumental Music Program
The Grove City High School instrumental music program has over 300 wind, percussion, and string musicians who participate in various performing groups. These groups include the Marching Band, Symphonic Band, Concert Bands, Jazz Bands, Concert Orchestra, Symphony Orchestra, and Percussion Ensemble. There is also a Color Guard that is part of the Marching Band as well as participates in Winter Guard competitions.

The Grove City High School Marching Band has received over 30 Grand Champion awards over the last ten years in OMEA competitions. The band received superior ratings at the OMEA State Marching Band Contest every year since the contest's inception in 1980 until the fall of 2009 when repeated school levy failures resulted in the cancellation of all extracurricular activities, including marching band.

Highlights:
The Pasadena Tournament of Roses Parade - 1990, 2000 & 2017
Orlando Music Fest National Band Championship - 1993 & 1997
London New Year's Day Parade - 2005
Phoenix Fiesta Bowl Parade and National Band Championship - 2008 & 2012
In 2002, the band took 5th place in the finals of Bands Of America Regional Competition in Louisville, Kentucky as well as winning Outstanding Musical Performance. 
In 2003 the band was invited to the 42nd Annual Contest Of Champions in Murfreesboro, Tennessee and placed 5th in finals. 
 
 
Symphonic & Concert Bands - The Symphonic Band has consistently received superior ratings in Class AA at both district and state OMEA adjudicated events for over thirty years (since 1975), as has Concert Band I in Class B, and more recently Class A,  for over twenty years (since 1984).  Concert Band II performs in the Class C level, and earned straight superior ratings at both district and state adjudicated events in 2005.

Highlights for the Symphonic Band:

Performed at the 50th Anniversary of the Mid-West International Band and Orchestra Clinic in Chicago, Illinois on December 19, 1996. 
Invited to perform at the MidwestClinic again in 2002. 
Performed at the 1993 and 2001 OMEA State Convention and was the clinician band for the composer Francis McBeth at the 1995 OMEA State Convention, as well as for Mark Kelly in 1989. 
Guest band for the Directors' Clinic at Miami University with Donald Hunsburger of the Eastman School of Music and H. Robert Reynolds from the University of Michigan.

Extracurricular activities

 Boys Sports (Soccer, Golf, Cross Country, Football, Basketball, Wrestling, Swimming, Baseball, Track and Tennis)
 Girls Sports (Softball, Golf, Track, Basketball, Swimming, Gymnastics, Basketball and Football Cheerleading, Volleyball, Soccer, Tennis, and Cross Country)
 Instrumental Music programs (Marching Band, Concert Band, Symphonic Band, Jazz Band, Concert Orchestra, Symphonic Orchestra, Flag Corps)
 Vocal Music Programs (Concert Choir, Symphonic Choir, Chorale, Show Choir [Touch of Class (Co-ed) and Class Act (Unisex)], Men/Women's Chorus)
 Key Club
 Ski Club
 In-The-Know Team
 Drama Club
 German Exchange Program
 Foreign Language Club (Spanish, French, German)
 Mock Trial Team
 Art Club
 Feats of Clay Team
 WGCH News
 DECA
 School Store
 Business Professionals of America
 ROTC Drill Team
 Pistol Team
 Color Guard
 SLAM (Student Literary Arts Magazine)
 Yearbook
 National Honor Society
 Dawg Show
 Guitar Club
 LAIR
 Magic Club
 Grove City Young Life
 Japanese Language and Culture Club
 Geek Club
 Youth in Government
 Gender and Sexuality Alliance

Notable alumni
 Gary Burley - Cincinnati Bengals player
 Derek Combs - NFL Running Back
 Richard Cordray - American politician
 Ann Grossman - Professional tennis player
Alex Grinch - USC Football Defensive Coordinator
 Craig McDonald - Author, journalist
 Mike Mayers - MLB pitcher for the Los Angeles Angels
 Ben Swanson - Professional soccer player

References

External links
 
 ODE Report Card for 2009-2010
 District Website
 The Home of The Dawgs!
 Marching Band Boosters Website
 Boys Soccer Website

1970 establishments in Ohio
Educational institutions established in 1970
High schools in Franklin County, Ohio
Public high schools in Ohio